Cobra  is a 2012 Indian Malayalam-language action black comedy film written and directed by Lal, starring Mammootty and himself in the lead roles. The songs were composed by Alex Paul, and background score by Deepak Dev.

Plot
Cobra is the short form of Co-brothers (Kottayam Brothers). The film tells the story of two rich brothers: Raja and Kari. Gopalan and Balan play the roles of their security guards.

The two begin to seek brides to marry. Their marriages get fixed. But on the day of the marriages, one of the brides is late for the ceremony. Thinking that she has eloped, Raja cancels the marriage. They move to Coimbatore.

There they meet John Samuel  who is looking for prospective buyers for his house. He needs money for the education of his daughters, both of which are doing medical studies in Bangalore. While the Cobras are negotiating the deal, they see a picture of the two girls, Sherly and Annie and they plan to marry them. Samuel wants to hide the news of selling the house from his daughters; he asks the Cobras to hide the news for another 6 months until their studies are over. The Cobras say that they will delay the registration until the 6 months have passed, and during that period they will stay at Samuel's house as tenants.

Meanwhile, Isaac and his brother Albert are trying to forcefully take Samuel's house and his hospital. Isaac tries to humiliate the Cobras on the day of the inauguration of his new physical fitness center. Samuel and Isaac get into a verbal fight and set a boxing match the next weekend with a deal that whoever wins will get the hospital. Isaac finds out that Raja has a twin brother named Shivadas Naidu who looks exactly like him. Isaac blackmails Raja saying that if he does not forfeit, he will bring Shivadas to Kari. Raja thinks that it will break Kari's heart, so he decides to back out from the fight. However, Kari and Samuel decide to carry on with the match.

Raja joins them. Even during the match Isaac tries to blackmail Raja showing him Shivadas standing near the venue. Initially, Raja does not fight back and gets badly beaten. Then Kari comes into the ring and beats Albert and he also gets badly beaten by Isaac. Seeing Kari getting beaten up, Samuel tells him to accept the defeat, but Kari refuses and tells that if he fails then Raja will also fail and he won't allow for it. On hearing this, Raja fights back and defeats Isaac, thus winning the match. Meanwhile, seeing the love between Raja and Kari, Shivadas leaves the scene without anyone noticing.

Cast
Mammootty as Raja (Rajavembala) / Sivadas Naidu (dual role)
Lal as Kari (Karimoorkhan)
Lalu Alex as John Samuel 
Kaniha as Annie
Padmapriya as Sherly
Salim Kumar as Gopalan
Babu Antony as Isaac
Ranjith Velayudhan as Albert, Isaac's brother
Ramu
Maniyanpilla Raju as Balan/(Bralan)
Jagathy Sreekumar as grandfather of Isaac
Siddique as Alphonse(Raja and Siva's father)
Vijay Menon as Referee
Radhika as Raja's ex-fiancée
Leena Maria Paul as Kari's ex-fiancée

Music
The soundtrack album of the film was composed by Alex Paul and lyrics penned by Santhosh Varma.

Production 
The movie was shot at Ernakulam, Chalakudy, Trivandrum and Bangkok, Thailand.

Reception 
Sify.com's Moviebuzz rated the movie "average", saying it is "a botched up version of the conventional recipes".

Rediff.com rated 3/5, saying that "Cobra offers nothing much to the discerning viewer and just cashes in on the actors' star image".

References

2012 films
2010s Malayalam-language films
Films set in the 1980s
2012 romantic comedy films
Indian romantic comedy films
Films shot in Chalakudy
Films shot in Kochi
Films shot in Thiruvananthapuram
Films shot in Thrissur
Films directed by Lal